Kenneggy comprises two separate hamlets, Higher Kenneggy to the west and Lower Kennegy to the east, in Cornwall, England, UK.

To the south is the beach of Kenneggy Sands and to the north the hamlet of Kenneggy Downs.

The name Kenneggy is an anglicisation of the Cornish language keunegi, which means 'reed beds'.

References

Hamlets in Cornwall